Henri Auvinen (born February 21, 1993) is a Finnish professional ice hockey defenceman. He is currently a free agent having last played for Bodens HF in Hockeyettan.

Auvinen made his SM-liiga debut playing with JYP Jyväskylä during the 2011–12 SM-liiga season. He also played for HPK and Jukurit. He is now playing for the Boxers de Bordeaux since the 31/012023.

References

External links

1993 births
Living people
Finnish ice hockey defencemen
Frederikshavn White Hawks players
HPK players
Iisalmen Peli-Karhut players
Imatran Ketterä players
Jokipojat players
JYP-Akatemia players
JYP Jyväskylä players
KeuPa HT players
Lempäälän Kisa players
Mikkelin Jukurit players
Modo Hockey players
Sportspeople from Jyväskylä
21st-century Finnish people